Stoco Lake is a lake in the Lake Ontario drainage basin in Tweed, Hastings County, Ontario, Canada.

There are two named islands, Butternut Island and Grant Island, and one named bay, Cosy Cove at the northeast. The primary inflow is the Moira River, at the northwest. Secondary inflows are the Clare River at the east and Sulphide Creek at Cosy Cove at the northeast. The primary outflow is the Moira River, which exits via two channels: the eastern channel, designated the Moira River, and the named Western Channel. The two enclose Sugar Island. There are three settlements on the lake: the village of Tweed at the Moira River inflow at the northwest; Cosy Cove, on the bay Cosy Cove and at the Sulphide Creek inflow at the northeast; and Stoco at the Moira River eastern channel outflow. The Moira River flows into the Bay of Quinte on Lake Ontario at Belleville.

See also
List of lakes in Ontario

References

Lakes of Hastings County